The SS Karlsruhe was a German cargo ship from 1905 of the Hamburg America Line, which was sunk on 13 April 1945 with great loss of life by Soviet aircraft, during Operation Hannibal.

History 
The ship was built in 1905 at Schichau Seebeckwerft in Bremerhaven for the Hamburg America Line. In 1935 the ship was acquired by Ernst Russ Reederei.

Last voyage 
On 11 April 1945, the Karlsruhe took 1,083 refugees on board in Pillau and left the port at around 20:00 for the Hel Peninsula, where the ship arrived on 12 April 1945 in the morning. There, a convoy was formed with the steamers , SS Karlsruhe and three minesweepers, which departed at around 09:00 for Copenhagen.

The overloaded Karlsruhe was not able to keep up with the required speed of the convoy of 9 knots, and could only run a good 7 knots, and fell behind. On 13 April 1945, she was attacked by Soviet planes north of Stolpmünde and hit with a torpedo. The ship broke in two and sank within three to four minutes. The minesweepers of the 25th minesweeping flotilla, M 294 (Kapitänleutnant Volberts) and M 341 (Oberleutnant zur See Henry Peter Rickmers) were able to save only 150 of the approximately 1083 refugees (M294: 63 - M341: 87). The other 933 passengers perished.

Discovery of the wreck and speculations 
The well-preserved wreck was found and inspected by Polish divers in July 2020. Speculation persists some crates inside may contain art/ornaments looted from the Catherine Palace's Amber Room in 1941, taken to Königsberg and lost in 1945.

References

Sources
wrecksite
Eyewitness report of a survivor (in German)
Wlb Stuttgart
Reuters on the location of the ship

Ships of the Hamburg America Line
Maritime incidents in April 1945
1905 ships
Merchant ships of Germany
Steamships of Germany
World War II shipwrecks in the Baltic Sea
Ships sunk by Soviet aircraft